Joan Nybell Kaderavek is an American Speech-Language Pathologist, currently a retired Distinguished Professor at University of Toledo.  She has published the book "Language Disorders in Children: Fundamental Concepts of Assessment and Intervention."

References

Year of birth missing (living people)
Living people
University of Toledo faculty
American pathologists
Bowling Green State University alumni